Niko Bespalla (1938 - 28 March 2017), was an Albanian footballer. Famous for his fierce shooting, he played for Lokomotiva Durrës, Partizani Tirana, Dinamo Tirana and Erzeni Shijak in his career.

Club career
He grew up in Durrës along with parents and his two sisters, which is where he began playing football with the youth team of Puna Durrës. He captained the Durrës under-19 side to the national championship before being promoted to the senior team by then coach Adem Karapici in 1957 at the age of 19. In 1957 he was summoned to fulfil his military service and subsequently joined army club Partizani Tirana with whom he won two league titles.

Personal life
Bespalla was born in Durrës in 1938 into a Russian family who had moved to Albania in the 1920s, first living in Tiranë before settling in Durrës. His father, Spiridon Bespalov, married his mother Varvara in Podgorica, and then changed their last name from Bespalov to Bespalla. He was jailed for 7 years by the Communist regime in 1967 after allegedly stealing tin .

He was married to Flora and his only surviving child Justin Bespalla was also a footballer who played for Teuta Durrës and Erzeni Shijak amongst others. He died on 28 March 2017, aged 79.

Honours
Kategoria Superiore: 2
 1958, 1959

References

1938 births
2017 deaths
People from Shijak
Footballers from Durrës
Albanian footballers
Association football forwards
KF Teuta Durrës players
FK Partizani Tirana players
FK Dinamo Tirana players
KF Erzeni players
Kategoria Superiore players